Delta (also called "Delta" in the original language) is a 2008 Hungarian drama film directed by Kornél Mundruczó and starring violinist Félix Lajkó in a non-musical acting role and actress Orsi Tóth. Supporting cast include Sándor Gáspár as the stepfather, Lili Monori as the mother, Sándor Fábián as the uncle, Tamás Polgár as the village boy.

Delta won the 2008 Golden Reel at Hungarian Film Week.

External links

References

2008 films
2008 drama films
Films directed by Kornél Mundruczó
Incest in film
Films about siblings
Hungarian drama films